Parchel is a village in Zalaqi-ye Gharbi Rural District, Besharat District, Aligudarz County, Lorestan Province, Iran. At the 2006 census, its population was 554, in 82 families, making it the most populous village in the rural district and Besharat District.

References 

Towns and villages in Aligudarz County